This is a list of German television related events from 1966.

Events

Debuts

ARD
 January – Father Brown (1966–1972) 
 8 February –  (1966)
 1 July –  The Flintstones (1960–1966)
 12 September – The White Horses (1966–1967)
 17 September – Raumpatrouille – Die phantastischen Abenteuer des Raumschiffes Orion (1966)
 5 December – Polizeifunk ruft (1966–1970)

ZDF
19 October – Cliff Dexter (1966–1968) 
25 December – Treasure Island (1966–1967)

DFF
26 November – Schatten über Notre Dame (1966)

Television shows

1950s
Tagesschau (1952–present)

1960s
 heute (1963–present)
 Raumpatrouille (1966)

Births
21 February - Axel Bulthaupt, TV host

Deaths

References